Geoffrey "Geoff" Edward Ramer Aunger (born 4 February 1968 in Red Deer, Alberta) is a former Canadian soccer player. He played in various Canadian leagues and the lower tiers of the English leagues system before playing in the United States in the A-League and Major League Soccer. Aunger was also a member of the Canadian national soccer team member.

Club career
A striker/midfielder later converted into a defender as well, Aunger played youth soccer with the Coquitlam Metro-Ford Soccer Club. He began his professional career in 1987 in the Canadian Soccer League and played all six years of the league's existence and with five different teams. He started with the Vancouver 86ers and went on to play with the Winnipeg Fury, Victoria Vistas, Hamilton Steelers, London Lasers, and once more with the 86ers. He was the league's 7th leading scorer in 1988 with the Fury, 4th in 1991 with the Steelers and named a league All-Star in 1992, the final year of the league. He continued with the 86ers as they joined the APSL for the 1993 season, scoring 3 goals in 11 appearances. He was also a 1990 and 1991 All Canada soccer player with the British Columbia Institute of Technology.

Europe
Aunger tried his luck in England and successfully tried out for and signed with Luton Town for the 1993–94 season. Aunger had the best imagineable start, scoring two minutes into his debut match. He played but 6 times however for the Hatters first-team, having been dropped to the reserves after playing only 3 games. He was not re-signed at the end of the season. A brief stint with Third Division Chester City did not meet with any success either for Aunger.

United States
He rejoined the 86ers of the A-League and also played for the Milwaukee Wave of the indoor National Professional Soccer League. Aunger had 7 goals in 18 games with the 86ers in 1995.

Aunger played in the MLS for the New England Revolution in 1996, when he led the team in games and minutes played, while scoring 3 goals, all on penalties. He tried his luck once more in England, this time with Stockport County but made but one appearance, as a substitute the day after signing. He then joined the A-League's Seattle Sounders.

A second chance in MLS in 1998 with D.C. United, as Aunger won in training camp the right-back position. After 6 matches he lost his starting position and spent rest the season in and out of the line-up. 1999 saw him however start 24 games for the team however as a midfielder, and won the 1999 MLS Championship with United. He was also the first Canadian to play in the MLS Cup final. In 2000, Geoff made 26 appearances for United. He was traded to the Colorado Rapids in 2001, and appeared in one game. In total, Aunger played 104 regular season MLS games and 9 Cup play-off contests.

He became eligible for induction into the American National Soccer Hall of Fame in 2011.

International career
He made his debut for Canada in a March 1991 North American Championship match against Mexico, but since this game was not regarded official he won his first senior cap coming on as a sub in an April 1992 friendly match against China. He earned a total of 44 caps, scoring 4 goals. He has represented Canada in 13 FIFA World Cup qualification matches.

His final international was a November 1997 World Cup qualification match against Costa Rica, a game after which Alex Bunbury, Frank Yallop and Colin Miller also said farewell to the national team.

International goals
Scores and results list Canada's goal tally first.

Honours

D.C. United
Major League Soccer MLS Cup (1): 1999

References

External links
 
 
 
 

1968 births
Living people
Sportspeople from Red Deer, Alberta
Canadian people of German descent
Soccer people from Alberta
Association football defenders
Association football midfielders
Association football forwards
Association football utility players
Canadian soccer players
Canada men's international soccer players
Canadian expatriate soccer players
Canadian expatriate sportspeople in the United States
1993 CONCACAF Gold Cup players
1996 CONCACAF Gold Cup players
Vancouver Whitecaps (1986–2010) players
Winnipeg Fury players
Victoria Vistas players
Hamilton Steelers (1981–1992) players
London Lasers players
Luton Town F.C. players
Chester City F.C. players
Major League Soccer players
Milwaukee Wave players
New England Revolution players
Stockport County F.C. players
Seattle Sounders (1994–2008) players
D.C. United players
Colorado Rapids players
Canadian Soccer League (1987–1992) players
English Football League players
National Professional Soccer League (1984–2001) players
A-League (1995–2004) players
Expatriate footballers in England
Expatriate soccer players in the United States
Major League Soccer All-Stars
D.C. United draft picks
Canadian expatriate sportspeople in England